KXO-FM (107.5 MHz) is a commercial FM radio station licensed to El Centro, California, and serving the Imperial Valley.  It broadcasts an adult contemporary radio format and is owned and operated by KXO Inc., along with KXO 1230 AM. The studios and offices are on Main Street in El Centro.  Carroll Buckley, the station's vice president, hosts the morning show.  Other DJs include Traci Lyon Ramirez and Gabe Lemuz.

KXO-FM has an effective radiated power (ERP) of 50,000 watts, the maximum for most radio stations in the Imperial Valley.  The transmitter is off West Villa Avenue in El Centro.

History
It was the FM counterpart to KXO 1230 AM.  

It has always been separately programmed from its sister station.  In the 1970s, 1230 KXO had a full service, middle of the road format, while 107.5 KXO-FM broadcast an automated beautiful music format.  It played quarter-hour sweeps of mostly instrumental cover versions of popular songs as well as Broadway and Hollywood show tunes.  

In the 1980s, as the audience for easy listening music began to age, more vocals were added until the station switched to soft adult contemporary music.  In the early 2000s, the tempo of the music picked up and KXO-FM transitioned to mainstream adult contemporary.

References

External links
KXO-FM website
KXO-FM 107.5 facebook

XO-FM
Mainstream adult contemporary radio stations in the United States
El Centro, California
Imperial County, California
1976 establishments in California
Radio stations established in 1976